Newbiggin is a village in County Durham, in England. Its population at the 2011 census was 146. It is situated on the north side of Teesdale, opposite Holwick. An influx of Derbyshire lead miners into the area in the late 18th century may have brought the name from Biggin.  The village is within the North Pennines Area of Outstanding Natural Beauty (AONB). 

The village of Newbiggin is up the River Tees from the incredible High Force, one of England's most impressive waterfalls. The hamlet of Bowlees is close by.

A Methodist chapel was built in the village in 1760. It is now a holiday let known as Newbiggin Chapel. For many years it was said to be one of the oldest Methodist chapel in continuous use. It is a listed building.

In February 2022 Robert Hooper, a hill farmer from the village, was cleared of charges of  dangerous driving and criminal damage, at Durham Crown Court, after he used a telehandler with forks to lift a car from a lane outside his farm, flip it and push it on its side on to the road outside.

References

Villages in County Durham